The Robson River is a short but swift, rapid and waterfall-infested river in Mount Robson Provincial Park of British Columbia.  It is a tributary of the Upper Fraser River and it originates near Robson Pass, which divides the Robson River and the headwaters of the Smoky River drainage.  There are three lakes along the river's course as well as four waterfalls.

Course

Robson Lake to Berg Lake

The Robson River begins in Robson Lake, which is located at the toe of the Robson Glacier.  After exiting the lake, the river flows northwest then southwest before entering Berg Lake.  Before entering Berg Lake, the river widens and splits into many small streams before flowing into the northeast end of Berg Lake.

Berg Lake to Kinney Lake
The river exits the southwest end and flows west for about  until dropping over spectacular Emperor Falls, a  plunge at the head of a  canyon in which the river thunders over two more waterfalls.  The first is Falls of the Pool, which comes about halfway down the gorge and at the end of the canyon is White Falls, a multi-tiered waterfall that cannot be seen in its entirety from the main trail.  All these falls are collectively known as the Valley of a Thousand Falls.  The river continues south from White Falls for another  before entering Kinney Lake, which sits directly at the base of the Robson River's namesake peak, Mount Robson.  Between Berg and Kinney Lakes, the river loses  of elevation, much of which is lost in the gorge between Emperor and White Falls.  Once again, prior to entering another lake, this time Kinney, the river spreads out very wide & divides into many braids before flowing into the lake.

Kinney Lake to the Fraser River
About halfway between Kinney Lake & the Fraser is Knowlton Falls, the first waterfall seen on the Berg Lake Trail.

In total, the river loses  of elevation between Robson Lake and the Fraser River, three-quarters of which is lost between Berg and Kinney Lakes.

Hiking
The main hiking trail in the area is the Berg Lake Trail, which begins at the Yellowhead Highway near the mouth of the Robson.  It goes all the way to its namesake lake, where the trail splits into more trails.  Reaching Berg Lake is usually a multi-day trip.  However, it is possible and it is done in a single day by some.

Not everyone chooses to go all the way to Berg Lake though.  Some will settle with a much quicker but still satisfying trip to Kinney Lake.  Bikes are permitted all the way up to Kinney Lake and a ways beyond.  Part way down the shore of the lake is a bike lock-up.  From here, anyone continuing to go further upriver has to go on foot.

The Berg Lake trail also gives hikers looks at the Robson's waterfalls.  Knowlton Falls is seen about halfway between the trailhead and Kinney Lake while hikers can stare into the canyon at White Falls and Falls of the Pool as the trail climbs toward Berg Lake.

See also
List of British Columbia rivers

References

Rivers of British Columbia
Tributaries of the Fraser River
Robson Valley
Rivers of the Canadian Rockies
Cariboo Land District